Don Bosco English Medium School Monigram, or DBEMS, is a mixed-sex English medium school established in 2005. It is run by the Roman Catholic Diocese of Krishnagar. The school operates under the Indian Certificate of Secondary Education in rural Murshidabad.

Motto
The motto of the institution is "Duty, Discipline, and Excellence".

Campus

Don Bosco English Medium School Monigram is situated in a rural area of Monigram under the Sagardighi police station.

Aim

According to the school's prospectus, "The aim of the institution is to impart sound education to the students by forming in them habits of virtue, discipline, and self-efficiency to become useful and responsible citizens of our motherland, India."

Facilities 
DBEMS facilities include:
Hostel
NCC
YCS Movement
Leadership training
Social service club
Two big playgrounds

Educational system 

The school is an ICSE board school. There are two main examinations - the half-yearly examinations and the final examination. There are also constant evaluations in the form of assignments, unit tests, and project works which all contribute to the scholastic performance of a student at the end of the year.

Half-yearly exams are held in the months of September–October and final exams are held in late February to early March. A student needs at least 90% attendance to sit in an examination hall.

Curriculum 
The school follows the Indian Certificate of Secondary Education Board until class ten.

External links
https://www.facebook.com/groups/287795511366952/

Salesian schools
Catholic schools in India
Primary schools in West Bengal
High schools and secondary schools in West Bengal
Christian schools in West Bengal
Schools in Murshidabad district
Educational institutions established in 2005
2005 establishments in West Bengal
Boarding schools in West Bengal